Tomislav Friščić is a Professor of Chemistry at McGill University, Montréal and a Tier-1 Canada Research Chair in mechanochemistry and solid-state chemistry. His research focus is at the interface of green chemistry and materials science, developing solvent-free chemistry and mechanochemistry for the cleaner, efficient synthesis of molecules and materials, including organic solids such as pharmaceutical cocrystals, coordination polymers and Metal-Organic Frameworks (MOFs), and a wide range of organic targets such as active pharmaceutical ingredients. He is a Fellow of the Royal Society of Chemistry (RSC) and a member of the College of New Scholars, Artists and Scientists of the Royal Society of Canada. He has served on the Editorial Board of CrystEngComm, the Early Career Board of the ACS journal ACS Sustainable Chemistry & Engineering, and was as an Associate Editor for the journal Molecular Crystals & Liquid Crystals. He was a Topic Editor, and is currently the Social Media Editor and member of the Editorial Advisory Board of the journal Crystal Growth & Design published by the American Chemical Society (ACS).
He famously has a dog named Zizi.

Education 
Friščić was born in 1978, and received his B.Sc. in 2001 from the University of Zagreb with Prof. Branko Kaitner. He then moved to obtain a Ph.D. with Prof. Leonard R. MacGillivray at the University of Iowa until 2006. He was a post-doctoral research associate with Prof. William Jones at the Pfizer Institute for Pharmaceutical Materials Science and University of Cambridge (2006-2008), and then a Herchel Smith Research Fellow and a Fellow of Sidney Sussex College at the University of Cambridge (2008-2011).

Career and research 
Friščić started his tenure track in 2011 at the Chemistry Department of McGill University as an Assistant Professor, received tenure and was promoted to Associate Professor in early 2016, and has been a full Professor and William Dawson Scholar since November 2019. His group's research focuses on using solvent-free green chemistry, including mechanochemistry, accelerated aging, reactive aging (RAging) and other related techniques like acoustic mixing for various applications,  such as noble metal recycling or cellulose enzymatic depolymerization. With his former student Dr. Cristina Mottillo he founded in 2016 a startup called ACSYNAM, that makes hypergolic MOFs for rocket and space propulsion.

Selected publications 
Metal recycling

 Oxidative Mechanochemistry: Direct, Room‐Temperature, Solvent‐Free Conversion of Palladium and Gold Metals into Soluble Salts and Coordination Complexes

Acoustic mixing

 Simple, scalable mechanosynthesis of metal–organic frameworks using liquid-assisted resonant acoustic mixing

Solid-state enzymatic depolymerisation of cellulose

 Solvent‐Free Enzyme Activity: Quick, High‐Yielding Mechanoenzymatic Hydrolysis of Cellulose into Glucose

Hypergolic MOFs for rocket fuel applications

 Hypergolic Triggers as Co‐crystal Formers: Co‐crystallization for Creating New Hypergolic Materials with Tunable Energy Content
 Hypergolic zeolitic imidazolate frameworks (ZIFs) as next-generation solid fuels: Unlocking the latent energetic behavior of ZIFs

References 

University of Zagreb alumni
Canadian chemists
Croatian chemists
Academic staff of McGill University
University of Iowa alumni
Year of birth missing (living people)
Living people